Byādhi (Pali; Sanskrit: vyādhi) is a Buddhist term that is commonly translated as sickness, illness, disease, etc., and is identified as an aspect of dukkha (suffering) within the teachings on the Four Noble Truths.

Within the Four Noble Truths
Within the teachings on the Four Noble Truths, byādhi is identified as an aspect of dukkha (suffering). For example, The Discourse That Sets Turning the Wheel of Truth states:
 Now this, bhikkhus, is the noble truth of suffering [dukkha]: birth is suffering, aging is suffering, illness (byādhi) is suffering, death is suffering; union with what is displeasing is suffering; separation from what is pleasing is suffering; not to get what one wants is suffering; in brief, the five aggregates subject to clinging are suffering.

Byādhi can refer to physical or psychological sickness. Chogyam Trunpa explains the suffering (dukkha) of sickness as follows:

When you are sick, you feel physically dejected by life, with all sorts of complaints, aches, and pains. When you get attacked by sickness, you begin to feel the loss of the beautiful wings and nice feathers you used to have. Everything is disheveled. You can't even smile or laugh at your own jokes. You are completely demoralized and under attack.

References

Web references

Sources

 
 
 
 
 
 
 
 
 
 

Buddhist philosophical concepts